LaceDarius Dunn (born September 5, 1987) is an American basketball player for Hapoel hevel modiin of the Israeli National League. In college basketball, he played for the Baylor Bears men's basketball team. As a junior in 2009–2010, Dunn was an honorable mention to the All-American team and named to the second team All Big 12 team after scoring 19.6 points per game over 36 games.

College career

Professional speculation
On April 15, 2010, Dunn ended speculation that he would forgo his senior season at Baylor University and enter the 2010 NBA Draft by announcing his return for the 2010–2011 season. As of April 2010, Dunn was speculated to be a second round pick in the 2011 NBA Draft. He ended up being the Big 12 All Time Scoring Leader.

Arrest and suspension
On October 5, 2010, Dunn was indefinitely suspended from the Baylor Bears men's basketball team after he was arrested for aggravated assault of his girlfriend in Waco, but charges were dropped after the victim refused to press charges.

Professional career
In July 2011 he signed with Bnei HaSharon in Israel for one season.
In September 2012, LaceDarius signed with S.L. Benfica in Portugal At Benfica, he won the League as a key player in the team, being named Player of the Year, Newcomer of the Year, Most Improved Player of the Year, Import Player of the Year and also named on the First Team by Eurobasket.com.

On August 5, 2019, Dunn signed a one-year deal with Hapoel Afula of the Israeli National League.

References

External links
Official Baylor profile
RealGM profile

1987 births
Living people
American expatriate basketball people in Israel
American expatriate basketball people in Kosovo
American expatriate basketball people in Poland
American expatriate basketball people in Portugal
American expatriate basketball people in Turkey
American men's basketball players
AZS Koszalin players
Basketball players from Louisiana
Baylor Bears men's basketball players
Bnei HaSharon players
Hapoel Afula players
KB Prishtina players
Point guards
S.L. Benfica basketball players
Sakarya BB players
Shooting guards
Sportspeople from Monroe, Louisiana